Boz Quch or Bozquch or Buzquch or Bozghooch may refer to:
 Boz Quch-e Olya
 Boz Quch-e Sofla